Loudovikos was a corvette of the Hellenic Navy built in 1838 at the Poros Naval Shipyard, designed by naval architect Georgios Tombazis. It was named after King Ludwig I of Bavaria, the father of King Otto of Greece.

It was a relatively large ship (length 44.1 m, 1000-ton displacement), was armed with two 22-lb plus four 20-lb long guns, and twenty-four 32-lb carronades, and had a crew of 182. The ship was not operationally utilized, and since 1846 it was used as a training ship (renamed Messolongion after the ousting of Otto in 1862). It officially remained in service with the Royal Hellenic Navy until 1873.

References 
L.S. Skartsis, "Greek Vehicle & Machine Manufacturers 1800 to present: A Pictorial History", Marathon (2012)  (eBook)
 Piraeus Maritime Museum 

Corvettes of the Hellenic Navy
Ships built in Greece
1838 ships